Chamakada or Chamakkada is one of the trade hubs of the city of Kollam, India. It is an important neighbourhood in the city and is located at the core Downtown Kollam area. The area is very famous for wholesale dealers and rice merchants. The local retail dealers are filling the stocks regularly from Chamakada-based wholesale dealers. So many bank branches, godowns, store rooms, printing presses, automobile spare parts stores, courier services etc. are located at Chamakada area. Chamakada is the second main commercial centre of Kollam city after Chinnakada. So many famous restaurants also located at Chamakada.

Chamakada: The Export & Commercial Hub of Kollam
Chamakada is an export and commercial hub of Kollam city. The ancient Kollam city was one of the famous trade centers. Marco Polo, the great Venician traveller, who was in Chinese service under Kublahan in 1275, visited Kollam and other towns on the west coast, in his capacity as a Chinese mandarin. He pointed out that Old Kollam is the only town in west coast with multi-story buildings. We can see those buildings in the downtown area of Kollam even now. He found Christians and Jews living in Coilum (Kollam). He also found merchants from China and Arabia. He has given a detailed account of Kollam in his writings, extracts of which are reproduced in the Travancore Manual. Remnants of stone age also found from Kollam city, that reveals the importance of Kollam city.

Because of the importance of Chamakada as a trade & export hub, Export Inspection Council of India (EICI) runs a Sub office with lab facility at Chamakada. It is one among the 7 Sub offices of EICI in South India. As an important commercial centre in Kerala, Kerala Fire Force is running a Fire Station at Chamakada.

Chamakkada course of Kollam Canal
Kollam Canal is a bustling part of Trivandrum-Shornur Canal (TS Canal) system, ideal for tourism and container transportation. The Inland Navigation Department is having jurisdiction over Kollam Canal. Kollam Canal was an arterial inland waterway of old Quilon city. It was the major trade channel of Travancore state that time. Giant cargo vessels ferrying different types of goods through this canal were a common view of Quilon city those days. Chamakada served as a harbour for unloading the goods brought by these vessels to Kollam. Processed cashew from various factories in the Cashew Capital along with other goods from the wholesale markets of old Quilon city for export was the major export material handled at Chamakada that time. These activities has made Chamakada an important business-export hub of Quilon and that gave way for various institutions like Export Inspection Council of India (EICI) to start branches at Kollam city.

See also
 Kollam
 Chinnakada
 Andamukkam
 Kadappakada

References

Neighbourhoods in Kollam